Kadra Mahamoud Haid is a Djiboutian  politician, political advisor, and First Lady of Djibouti since 1999. She is the wife of President Ismaïl Omar Guelleh

In 2003, Haid spoke against female genital mutilation (FGM), "These practices are not gone, an estimated two million young girls a year, 6,000 per day, still undergo these mutilations in all their forms. The consequences are dramatic, it can cause death by haemorrhage, urinary infections, cysts and childbirth difficulties, not to mention psychological damage." Although a 1995 law banned FGM, it has been estimated that 98% of women in Djibouti are victims of it.

Somali businessman Abdourahman Boreh, one of the richest people in Djibouti, was expelled because of an investment dispute with Haid.

In 2014, it was reported that Guelleh "holds on to that power jealously, sharing it only with his influential wife". Africa Intelligence has stated that she "acts as a sort of vice president".

Personal life
Through her current marriage to Ismaïl Omar Guelleh, she has two daughters, presidential adviser Haibado and businesswoman Fatouma-Awo. In addition, she has a son from her first marriage, Naguib Abdallah Kamil, who she is reportedly grooming for "high political responsibilities" and a daughter, Nazli, who is a businesswoman.

References

Living people
Year of birth missing (living people)
First ladies of Djibouti
Djiboutian women in politics
People's Rally for Progress politicians